Mariya Manolova (born 6 September 1963) is a Bulgarian biathlete. She competed at the 1992 Winter Olympics and the 1994 Winter Olympics.

References

1963 births
Living people
People from Chepelare
Biathletes at the 1992 Winter Olympics
Biathletes at the 1994 Winter Olympics
Bulgarian female biathletes
Olympic biathletes of Bulgaria
20th-century Bulgarian women